Swansea Mall was a regional shopping mall located in Swansea, Massachusetts. It served the Southeastern Massachusetts area. Located off Exit 3 of I-195, the building is situated at the intersection of U.S. Route 6 and Massachusetts Route 118, on Swansea Mall Drive. It had three out-parcel buildings: a Walmart building behind the mall, a former Toys "R" Us, a shared PriceRite (closed in 2020) & Dollar Tree (formerly a Service Merchandise). The Swansea Crossings shopping plaza is across the street, and contains a Big Lots and a Regal Cinemas movie theater. The mall closed permanently on March 31, 2019. It was purchased by Anagnost Companies in May 2019 at auction. Redevelopment has begun on the mall.

History
During the building of the mall, there were issues between union and non-union workers that led to multiple fights between the sides and several injuries.

Swansea Mall originally opened in 1975 with two anchors: Sears and Edgar Department Stores. The mall had a 4-screen movie theater. In the early 1980s, the mall expanded and added two anchors, national discount department store Caldor and Rhode Island-based department store Apex. Two out-parcels were located just south of the original mall, populated by Toys "R" Us and Service Merchandise.

In 1989, the mall underwent a major interior renovation. By the 1990s, the movie theater was closed, original anchor Edgar's, then out-of-business, was replaced by Jordan Marsh, the hall space was altered with the removal of water fountains, the installation of new lighting, and new floor tiling, and the mall's logo was changed to its current design.

In 1996, Jordan Marsh was sold to Macy's. Caldor suffered damage during a fire in 1997 and was closed for a year of renovation. It closed permanently when the company went out of business in 1999. Several restaurants left the mall in the late '90s, such as the pizzeria Roman Delight and Newport Creamery. In 1995, the food court was opened.

In 2001, a Walmart replaced the previous Caldor location after its purchase in 1999. Apex closed the same year.

Walmart moved out of the mall and into its own building in September 2013. The previous Walmart wing of the mall was demolished and replaced with parking and a new mall entrance. In December 2013, mall owner Carlyle Development sold off the two southern out-parcel buildings, a Toys R Us and Dollar Tree/Price Rite, to Gator Investments, and announced that it was putting the Swansea Mall up for sale. In January 2014, the mall brought management in-house and ended its relationship with management company, Jones Lang LaSalle. Also in 2014, Kaplan Retail Consulting was hired to oversee the leasing of the mall's retail space. A sale agreement was reached via online auction in November 2014, but by January 2015 the plans had fallen through.

On December 28, 2016, it was announced that Sears would be closing as part of its plan to close 150 stores nationwide. The store closed in March 2017. The closure of Sears left the mall with Macy's as its only anchor.

Closure and redevelopment 

On June 29, 2018, the out-parcel Toys "R" Us was closed after the chain filed for bankruptcy and closed all US locations. The space was rented as a Spirit Halloween for multiple years after the Toys "R" Us closed. On January 9, 2019, it was announced that Macy's would be closing on March 31, 2019, as part of its plan to close 9 stores nationwide. In January of 2019, the Swansea Board of Selectmen discussed a proposal to take the mall property by eminent domain for redevelopment. On January 31, 2019, Carlyle Partners, the mall's owner, announced that Swansea Mall would be closing by March 31, 2019. On March 31, the mall ceased business and closed.

In May 2019, Anagnost Companies, a real estate developer and management company, purchased the property at auction for $6.65 million with plans to turn it into a multifaceted facility. The redevelopment proposal was met with opposition from Walmart which claimed that the mixed-use proposal violated previous easements, covenants, and restrictions (ECRs) that had been made with the former Swansea Mall landowners in 2013; Walmart indicated it would seek to preclude the redevelopment through litigation. By late 2020, redevelopment work had stalled amid growing legal disputes between Anagnost and Walmart.

In May 2021, the developers estimated they would spend $200 million between redeveloping the mall and constructing apartments on the property. The town of Swansea indicated it would pursue litigation against Walmart to acquire the ECRs through eminent domain to allow the redevelopment of the mall to move forward. For a time, town officials considered moving the town offices to the property, but announced in October 2021 that legal issues restricted the move. By late 2021 the property had two tenants; a self-storage facility had opened on the former Apex site and a Pentecostal Church congregation occupied the former Macy’s. During this time, the southern portion of the mall structure remained abandoned while the northern portion had been substantially gutted.

In Summer 2022, Anagnost announced it had finalized negotiations with Walmart which would allow the redevelopment of the property to continue. Anagnost revealed the property would be renamed the “Shoppes at Swansea” and would transform the former enclosed mall into an outward-facing mixed-use shopping plaza with 110,000 square feet of retail space along with two 72-unit housing complexes. In Fall 2022, the decrepit ring road that formerly encircled the mall structure was repaired and a fitness club moved into the renovated northern section. As of 2023, no additional tenants have moved into the renovated sections of the property; construction has not been initialized for the abandoned southern sections.

References

External links 
 Proposed expansion as of 2007

Shopping malls in Massachusetts
Shopping malls established in 1975
Defunct shopping malls in the United States
Buildings and structures in Bristol County, Massachusetts
Tourist attractions in Bristol County, Massachusetts
1975 establishments in Massachusetts
Shopping malls disestablished in 2019